Caldoramide is a pentapeptide isolated from the cyanobacteria Caldora penicillata. It has cytotoxic effects on cancer cells and has been the subject of extensive oncological research. It is structurally analogous to belamide A and dolastatin 15. Its appearance is that of a powdery, white, substance.

Structure 
The N-terminus for Caldoramide is N,N-dimethylvaline which is attached to a valine which is attached to an N-Me-valine connected to an N-Me-isoleucine which is attached to the C-terminus.  The molecule can also be written as N,N-diMe-Val-Val-N-Me-Val-N-Me-Ile-3-O-Me-4-benzylpyrrolinone.

Extraction 
Freeze-dried samples of Caldora penicillata had EtOAc−MeOH and H2O−EtOH applied to them in order to extract Caldoramide. The extracts were partitioned with n-BuOH and H2O and then fractions were taken based on solubility in either EtOAc or BuOH. Caldoramide was extracted from the BuOH soluble fraction.

Pharmacological activity 
Caldoramide has been found to be cytotoxic against HCT116 colorectal cancer cell lines.

See also 

 Laucysteinamide A

References 

Pentapeptides
Cyanotoxins